Maximilian (Maksymilian) Antoni Piotrowski (1813–1875) was a Polish painter and professor at the Academy of Fine Arts in Kaliningrad. Additionally, he was a Polish patriot who took part in the national uprisings of the time.

Life
Maximilian Antoni Piotrowski was born on June, 08, 1813, in Bromberg, then in Prussia. His father Andrzej owned a bakery in the old town, at 22 Długa street. His wife Teresa née Baranowska and himself moved to the city a year before his birth, coming from the nearby village of Koronowo. He spent his youth in his hometown, under the first decades of Prussian occupation.

After graduating from high school, Maximilian moved to Berlin at the age of 20 (1833) to study painting at the Academy of Fine Arts. In 1835, he studied historical painting under the direction of Wilhelm Hensel. Once having completed his studies in Berlin in 1838, he went on to an artistic tour through Germany. He visited Düsseldorf where he was taught by Friedrich Wilhelm Schadow. Schadow was a member of the Nazarene movement aspiring to revive spirituality in art, with a return to Quattrocento-like features, hence differentiating from the pseudo-classicism then in vogue in Europe. Back to the German capital, he received the first prize of the Academy. 

To achieve his artistic education, Maximilian traveled in the fall of 1842, to Italy. He first stayed in Rome where he had the opportunity to meet another member of the Nazarene movement, Johann Friedrich Overbeck.  In spring of 1843, Maximilian embarked upon a journey through the italian country. Fascinated by Italian landscapes, he painted many scenes depicting daily life, together with sentimental-romantic and religious compositions; such works were later exhibited in Berlin at one of his exhibitions (1844).

After Italy, he stayed in Munich so as to establishing artistic contacts: accordingly, he met Peter von Cornelius and in particular Wilhelm von Kaulbach, an outstanding painter of historical scenes.

In early 1844, he moved back to Berlin, concluding his studies and staying there till 1847. During this period, Maximilian had a contract to work with a group on a monumental historical painting depicting an episode of the Anglo-Afghan War, commissioned by William Empton. However, the demise of the latter put a sudden end to the project. The draft work was only at a preparatory stage based on cardboard material: be that as it may, the unfinished work was displayed at an 1846 exhibition in Berlin. The author kept from this project a drawing, Wounded english soldier that will be exhibited in 1925. After this unexpected ending, Piotrowski left the field of historical painting to turn to Dolce Far Niente subjects.

In 1848, in the wake of the Spring of the Nations, he took part to a freedom demonstration in Berlin; he was arrested for it, but soon released. The same year, Maximilian traveled to Prussian Poland and similarly participated to the Greater Poland uprising in Bydgoszcz and Poznań. A group of his drawings are entirely related to these events. Furthermore, Piotrowski's paintings from that period take root from these upheavals.

One can highlight from this period: 
 Revolutionary;
 On the barricades;
 Spring of Nations of 1848. 

The collapse of the Spring of Nations combined with the lack of opportunities for his artistic development in his homeland compelled him to return to Berlin. However, he did not stay long, as in 1849, he moved to Königsberg (today's Kaliningrad), to be appointed as professor at the Academy of Fine Arts.

In Königsberg, he led for 26 years the class of ancient plaster drawing. In 1853, he decorated a plafond of the Królewiec royal railway station. The middle room ceiling of the waiting room was adorned with an allegory depicting the benefits of the railway for the country. Maximilian also decorated with polychromes the auditorium of the University of Königsberg, between 1861 and 1872 together with G. Graf. From 1836 onwards, Piotrowski started to be present in many European exhibitions: Dresden, Ghent, Leipzig or Paris.

In 1856, Piotrowski sent two paintings to the Kraków exhibition set up by the Kraków Society of Friends of Fine Arts: the Nativity of Christ and Invitation to a rendez vous. It was his first participation to the Society's exhibitions and was renewed almost annually. He traveled as well to Kraków via Warsaw and Częstochowa. In 1858, he exhibited the Death of Wanda at the Kraków's event: the painting brought him great fame and recognition among Polish and German critics. In 1864, he exhibited in Berlin his work Marie Antoinette with the Dauphin in the Temple prison, which was similarly shown in Krakow three years later. During the 1863 January Uprising, Maximilian studio in Königsberg housed local Polish insurgents. A few of his paintings have been inspired by this series of events of this year.

Piotrowski died on November 29, 1875 in Königsberg: his body was transferred to Bydgoszcz and buried inside the family crypt of the Staro Farny Cemetery in Grunwaldzka street.

Works
Maximilian Piotrowski painted about 200 paintings. In Berlin, he was influenced by the historical sentimentality of the Düsseldorf school. His paintings were highly valued by his contemporaries, which is a reason of his appointment as a professor at the Academy of Fine Arts in Königsberg. One of his most famous realisations in this city was the polychrome in the university hall, rendering allegories of philosophy, history and mathematics.

Active during the Biedermeier period, Maximilian Piotrowski mastered his techniques: 
 oil paint;
 pastel;
 watercolor painting;
 tempera painting.

His topics were not only referring to historical scenes, he additionally represented genre painting, religious pictures or portraits.
One can cite, among others:
 The Head of a Jew from Thessaloniki, oil paint sketch;
 Raftsmen on the Neman river, genre scene;
 Louis XV and Madame de Pompadour or the Death of Wanda, historical compositions;
  Artist's self-portrait with a palette.

Works by Piotrowski are dispersed among international collections. In Poland, one can highlight the following paintings:
 The Separation of Marie Antoinette from the young Dauphin the Temple prison exhibited at the National Museum of Poznań;
 Death of Wanda at the National Museum of Kraków.
Most of the painter's works are displayed in District Museum of Bydgoszcz, i.e. several dozens of artistic items. Some religious paintings are to be found in Bydgoszcz churches.

According to Tadeusz Dobrowolski, director of the National Museum in Krakow between 1950 and 1956:
 

The national affiliation of Piotrowski's art was the subject of long disputes between Polish and German experts. The painter himself, living and working in an ethnically foreign environment, never denied his Polishness. Among his works are a whole range of Polish topics, such as Before the Battle of Grunwald, Jagiełło at the bedside of the dead Jadwiga, Episode from the January Uprising or the Death of Wanda, relating the legend of a Polish princess who chose suicide rather than marrying a German husband. Worth noticing, whenever he wrote about his native city in his German letters, Maximilian always used Bydgoszcz instead of Bromberg.

Emotional binds between Piotrowski and Bydgoszcz are to be found in many of his works, inter alia:
 Boys playing with the ruins of the Bydgoszcz castle in the background;
 Kujawy meetings;
 Raftsmen dancing on a boat;
 Raftsmen's Supper;
 Before going to church, a family portrait;  
 portraits of his relatives (father, mother, sister, brother).

As for the pious paintings, some of them are still exposed in Bydgoszcz churches: Saint Giles in Saint Andrew Bobola's Church and the Madonna of the Immaculate Conception in St Peter's and St Paul's Church. The latter was originally placed in the church of St. Ignatius of Loyola, razed in 1940.

Recognition
First modern researches on Piotrowski were initiated during the interwar period by Bydgoszcz archivist Zygmunt Malewski. It was only after World War II that an extensive literature about the painter appeared.

From December 20, 1925, till January 25, 1926, an exhibition of Maximilian's works was set up in Bydgoszcz and in Toruń a year later, at the occasion of the 50th anniversary of his death. The artist, almost completely forgotten at that time, was portrayed through 92 works in the halls of the Municipal Museum.
Until the ouset of the war, the museum carried out a campaign to collect Piotrowski's items: by 1939, over 100 oil paints, watercolors, tempera paintings and drawings were gathered from donations and purchases:
 Counselor Adam Logi from Poznań donated in 1927, a Portrait of Wilhelm Schadow, Balcony scene, Portrait of the artist's siblings and Portrait of the artist's mother (from 1848);
 Father prelate Tadeusz Malczewski donated the oil painting St. Salome, painted in 1837 for the Bydgoszcz Cathedral;
 The artist's family (grandson Stanisław and niece - Pelagi Thierling from Poznań) donated 39 works, among which Artist's self-portrait with a palette in 1936;
 the museum purchased several oil paintings (Portrait of the artist's sister, Rest and revolutionist - a study) in 1928, and Portrait of a woman in a white dress in 1934.

Unfortunately, many of Piotrowski's works have been destroyed during the last days of Bydgoszcz occupation, although the Nazi authorities ordered the entire collection to be evacuated to the countryside. The museum losses are estimated to 113 works (including 33 oil paintings, 3 watercolors, 1 tempa, 3 inks and 73 sketches and drawings), while only 10 paintings have been salvaged.

After the war, the District Museum in Bydgoszcz received 50 works (3 paintings and 47 drawings) by Maximilian Piotrowski from the Poznań Society of Friends of Learning. In a similar fashion, the institution kept on acquiring or purchasing works through the 1960s to the 1990s, like a batch of 84 drawings from a Poznań deposit in 1967. Latest acquisitions date back to 2018: Lady from Sorrento.

Exhibition of the artist's works were regularly presented by the District Museum (1948, 1963, 1970–1972, 1995). In 2000, for the 125th anniversary of Piotrowski's demise, the Bydgoszcz Museum exhibited the last exhibition to date. Currently, the Bydgoszcz museum collection comprises 21 paintings and 13 drawings and sketches, not to mention the deposit.

On November 26, 1950, for the 75th anniversary of his death, on the initiative of the Society of the Lovers of the City of Bydgoszcz, a commemorative plaque by Piotr Triebler has been placed on the wall of his family house at 22 Długa street. In addition, the association granted funds for the renovation of the painter's tombstone.

One of the streets in downtown has been named after the artist, the Maksymilian Piotrowski street.

Gallery

See also 

 Bydgoszcz
 Regional Museum in Bydgoszcz
 Kaliningrad
 Düsseldorf school of painting
 Biedermeier period
 Nazarene movement
 List of Polish people

References

External links 
 Regional Museum in Bydgoszcz

Bibliography 
  
  
  
  
  

1813 births
1875 deaths
Burials in Starofarny cemetery in Bydgoszcz
Polish independence activists
19th-century male artists
Artists from Bydgoszcz
Academic staff of Kunstakademie Königsberg